{{Infobox military unit
|unit_name= Massachusetts Air National Guard
|image= File:Massachusetts Air National Guard - Emblem.png
|image_size= 220px
|caption= Shield of the Massachusetts Air National Guard
|dates= 18 November 1921 - present
|country=
|allegiance= 
|branch= 
|type=
|role= "To meet commonwealth and federal mission responsibilities."
|size=
|command_structure=  Air National GuardMassachusetts National Guard
|garrison=  Massachusetts Air National Guard, Joint Force Headquarters-Massachusetts,  2 Randolph Road, Hanscom Air Force Base, MA 01731 
|garrison_label=
|nickname=
|patron=
|motto=
|colors=
|colors_label=
|march=
|mascot=
|battles=
|anniversaries=
|decorations=
|battle_honours=

|commander1= President Joe Biden(Commander-in-Chief)Frank Kendall III(Secretary of the Air Force)Governor Maura Healey''(Governor of the Commonwealth of Massachusetts and Commander-in-Chief of the Commonwealth of Massachusetts' Military Forces)
|commander1_label= Civilian leadership
|commander2= Major General Gary W. Keefe
|commander2_label= Commonwealth military leadership
|notable_commanders=

|aircraft_attack=
|aircraft_bomber=
|aircraft_Command_and_Control=
|aircraft_electronic=
|aircraft_fighter=F-15C Eagle
|aircraft_interceptor=
|aircraft_patrol=
|aircraft_recon=
|aircraft_transport=
|aircraft_tanker=
}}

The Massachusetts Air National Guard (MA ANG)''' is the aerial militia of the Commonwealth of Massachusetts, United States of America. It is, along with the Massachusetts Army National Guard, an element of the Massachusetts National Guard.

As commonwealth militia units, the units in the Massachusetts Air National Guard are not in the normal United States Air Force chain of command. They are under the jurisdiction of the Governor of Massachusetts through the office of the Massachusetts Adjutant General unless they are federalized when ordered by the President of the United States. The Massachusetts Air National Guard is headquartered on Hanscom Air Force Base, MA, and its commander is Brigadier General Virginia I. Gaglio.

Overview
Under the "Total Force" concept, Massachusetts Air National Guard units are considered to be Air Reserve Components (ARC) of the United States Air Force (USAF). Massachusetts ANG units are trained and equipped by the Air Force and are operationally gained by a Major Command of the USAF if federalized. In addition, the Massachusetts Air National Guard Airmen are assigned to Air Expeditionary Forces and are subject to deployment tasking orders along with their active duty and Air Force Reserve counterparts in their assigned cycle deployment window.

Along with their federal reserve obligations, as commonwealth militia units the elements of the Massachusetts ANG are subject to being activated by order of the Governor to provide protection of life and property, and preserve peace, order and public safety. State missions include disaster relief in times of earthquakes, hurricanes, floods and forest fires, search and rescue, protection of vital public services, and support to civil defense.

Components
The Massachusetts Air National Guard consists of the following major units:
 102d Intelligence Wing
 Established 18 November 1921 (as: 101st Observation Squadron), non-flying unit
 Stationed at: Otis Air National Guard Base, Mashpee 
 Gained by: Air Force Intelligence, Surveillance and Reconnaissance Agency
 Performs intelligence analysis of ISR data streaming from these sensors and fuse that information with other intelligence sources to provide war fighters timely, tailored, and actionable situational updates within minutes or seconds.

 104th Fighter Wing
 Established 24 February 1947 (as: 131st Fighter Squadron); operates: F-15C/D Eagle
 Stationed at: Barnes Air National Guard Base, Westfield
 Gained by: Air Combat Command
 The 104th Fighter Wing supports Air Force wartime contingency requirements and performs a variety of peacetime missions required by the Air Force to include an active Air Sovereignty Alert presence and compatible mobilization readiness.

Support Unit Functions and Capabilities:
 253d Cyberspace Engineering Installation Group
 Stationed at Otis Air National Guard Base, the old mission of the Headquarters 253d Cyberspace Engineering Installation Group was to train Airmen and be ready to deploy anywhere in the world on very short notice and provide quality communications and air traffic control services in support of Air Force requirements and other contingencies.

History
131st Fighter Squadron was organized by Lyle E. Halstead and Federally Recognized in February 1947

See also

 Massachusetts State Defense Force
 Massachusetts Wing Civil Air Patrol

References

 Gross, Charles J (1996), The Air National Guard and the American Military Tradition, United States Dept. of Defense, 
 Massachusetts National Guard website

External links

Massachusetts Executive Office of Public Safety and Security
102nd Intelligence Wing
104th Fighter Wing
Massachusetts National Guard

Military in Massachusetts
United States Air National Guard